Dahlia Bakery is a pastry shop in Seattle's Belltown neighborhood, in the U.S. state of Washington.

Description 
Dahlia Bakery is a bakery and pastry shop in Seattle's Belltown neighborhood, operated by Tom Douglas. The business serves bread, sandwiches (including breakfast sandwiches), and pastries for breakfast and lunch.

According to the Food Network, "This bakery serves up a triple coconut cream pie that keeps the crowds coming back for more. The pie has coconut in the crust, shredded coconut and coconut milk in the creamy filling, and toasted coconut on top, along with curls of white chocolate. It’s available as a whole  pie, a baby pie, a slice of pie or a coco pie 'bite.

Reception 
Adam H. Callaghan of Eater Seattle said the Triple Coconut Cream Pie is "a dessert so famous, President Obama asks for it by name, and seems to have it at every Seattle fundraiser he hosts". The Seattle Post-Intelligencer included the pie in a 2021 list of 26 "iconic Seattle bites". Allecia Vermillion included the business in Seattle Metropolitan's 2022 overview of "exceptional" breakfast sandwiches.

See also
 List of bakeries

References

External links 

 
 

Bakeries of Washington (state)
Belltown, Seattle
Restaurants in Seattle